The 1993 Copa Libertadores Final was a two-legged football match-up to determine the 1993 Copa Libertadores champion. The finals were a match up of Brazilian club São Paulo and Universidad Católica from Chile.

The 1993 final was São Paulo's third appearance in the final, and second consecutive final. Universidad Católica was playing in their first Libertadores final. São Paulo won the title 5–3 on aggregate.

Qualified teams

Venues

Match details

First leg

Source

Second leg

Source

References

1
l
l
Copa Libertadores Finals
l
l